North End is a neighborhood in Niagara Falls, New York.

Geography 
The North End neighborhood extends along Highland Avenue.

History 
The North End, like Little Italy, has declined significantly over the years. Originally a booming industrial district, predominantly Polish and German, since the 1940s the areas surrounding Highland Avenue have been predominantly African-American, several of the industries have closed and the area has become neglected. Recently, "green" industry has begun to move into the North End, bringing back some jobs.

The Niagara Falls Amtrak station and Niagara Falls Underground Railroad Heritage Center are located in the neighborhood. It is mainly considered to be anything located north of the primary railroad tracks within the city, with the exception of west of Ninth Street. The North End for most of the 20th century was predominantly a Polish, German and Italian neighborhood.

Neighborhoods in Niagara Falls, New York